Carolyn Jane Maitland (born 22 September 1983), known professionally as Carolyn Maitland, is a British actress, West End singer and performer best known for playing Marian Halcolme in The Woman in White at the Charing Cross Theatre in London, directed by Thom Southerland.  Maitland is also known for playing Grace Farrell in the 2019 tour of Annie and Molly Jensen in Ghost, opposite Andy Moss as Sam, on the 2016 national tour.

Personal life 
She was born on the Isle of Wight and went to Cowes High School and now lives in London with her fiancé who she met during Mamma Mia!. She has one sister, who trained as a ballerina at the Royal Ballet School and runs her own dance school.

Theatre career 
Maitland trained at Elmhurst School of Dance and Performing Arts (formerly known as Elmhurst Ballet School). She started her career as an actor and dancer for Reach for the Moon for LWT and a backing dancer for the MOBO Awards in 2002 for ITV before working with the late Brian Rogers on Broadway Christmas Spectacular. She joined Spirit of the Dance/Broadway in 2003 for two years before becoming lead vocalist on the QE2 for Belinda King Productions.

In 2007 she joined the international tour of Mamma Mia!. The following year she was offered the roles of 1st Cover Mabel (she had to wear a fat suit for this role), 2nd Cover Serena, Miss Bell & Swing on the UK tour of Fame. She was given her first lead understudy on the tour of High School Musical 2 as Gabriella.

2010 consisted mainly of cabarets and workshops until late in the year when she was offered her second lead understudy role as Lucy Harris in the musical Jekyll & Hyde produced by Bill Kenwright. She played opposite Marti Pellow from the '90s band Wet, Wet, Wet.

In 2012 she debuted her first West End show understudying the roles of Vivienne and Serena in Legally Blonde at the Savoy Theatre.

The following year she understudied Hannah Waddingham in the role of Lilli Vanessi/Katherine in Chichester Festival Theatre's 2012 revival of Kiss Me, Kate directed by Sir Trevor Nunn at The Old Vic. That led to creating the role of Rose and understudying Rebecca Thornhill in the role of Karen Holmes in From Here to Eternity at the Shaftesbury Theatre, London in 2013.

In May 2014 Maitland was to understudy Tamsin Carroll as Ellen Scott in the anticipated West End revival of Miss Saigon, produced by Cameron Mackintosh and directed by Laurence Connor.

Maitland was directed as Ellen by Claude-Michel Schönberg, Alain Boublil and Cameron Mackintosh three days before opening night when Miss Carroll became sick and couldn't perform. Miss Carroll recovered in time for opening night.

In 2015 Maitland starred in her first lead as Kathy Selden in Singin' in the Rain at Kilworth House Theatre directed by Mitch Sebastian.

Later that year she was to return to Miss Saigon as Ellen Scott.

She went on to star as Sally Bowles in Cabaret at ACT Aberdeen and the Daughter in The Memory Show at The Drayton Theatre.

Groundhog Day premiered in London in 2016 at The Old Vic in London where Maitland created the role of Joelle and understudied the part of Rita Hanson.

In January 2017 Maitland was cast to play alternate Alice and Mad Hatter in Wonderland: A New Alice. Maitland pulled out before rehearsals due to disagreements with the producer and the production company Wonderland the Musical Ltd regarding her contract.

In 2017 Maitland took over the role as Molly in Ghost from Sarah Harding due to the subsequent pain from an injury she received on the third series of The Jump. The Carns Theatre Passion reviewer said, "Her voice is just gorgeous and she carried all the numbers she was part of. She particularly stood out in her Act One solo 'With You' which bought tears to many eyes".

In October 2017 Maitland produced her first concert Songs Chosen By You for Live at Zedel.

In November 2017 she starred as Marian Halcolme in The Woman in White, with a revised score, which opened at the Charing Cross Theatre in London. Lyn Gardner of The Guardian wrote, "Carolyn Maitland sings with texture and gives the character definition." In his review for BroadwayWorld, Gary Nayol called Maitland's performance "[o]ne of 2017's best performances in the West End" and said, "Her [Maitland's] singing is worth the ticket price alone, belting into one of London's more tricky auditoria with total commitment and great technique, a masterclass in how to go full-on musical theatre passion without ever losing sight of the fact that the character is supposed to be real."

Maitland joined the West End revival of Annie as Grace Farrell, which began at the Piccadilly Theatre in London before showing at the Ed Mirvish Theatre in Downtown Toronto, Ontario, Canada. Television and stage star Lesley Nicol starred as Miss Hannigan.

Maitland continued playing Grace in the 2019 UK tour of Annie, opposite Anita Dobson, Lesley Joseph and Craig Revel-Horwood who all played Miss Hannigan during the tour.

In 2020 she played Rebecca Hershkowitz in the Park Theatre's production of Rags, opposite Dave Willetts as Avram.

Cast recordings 
 From Here to Eternity 
 Miss Saigon (2014 West End Revival Cast)

Awards and nominations 
 2014 West End Frame Understudy Of The Year Award [winner]
 2014 BroadwayWorld Understudy Of The Year Award [winner]

References 

1983 births
Living people
English stage actresses
Actresses from London